The 1955 New Jersey State Senate elections were held on November 8.

The elections took place midway through the first term of Governor Robert Meyner. Eleven of New Jersey's 21 counties held regular elections for Senator. The Democratic Party gained Camden, Essex and Salem counties.

Incumbents not running for re-election

Democratic
 Bernard W. Vogel (Middlesex)

Republican
 James Cafiero (Cape May)
 Bruce A. Wallace (Camden)

Summary of results by county

Close races 
Seats where the margin of victory was under 10%:

  gain
 
  gain
  gain

Burlington

Camden

Cape May

Essex

Gloucester

Middlesex

Monmouth

Salem

Somerset

General election

Candidates
Malcolm Forbes, incumbent Senator since 1952 and publisher of Forbes magazine
Charles W. Engelhard Jr., president of the Engelhard Corporation

Campaign
In a race later dubbed the "Battle of the Billionaires," Malcolm Forbes narrowly defeated Charles Engelhard.

The Democratic Party targeted Forbes in an effort to stave off a challenge to Governor Meyner in 1957. Forbes, who had already run for Governor in 1953 and possessed a large fortune, was expected to be able to self-fund a serious challenge to Meyner. Thus, they recruited Engelhard, a wealthy industrialist who had been a major contributor to the Democratic Party.

Although state election disclosure laws at the time did not require candidates to report spending on their own behalf, some observers as of 2013 believed this to be the most expensive state legislative contest in history. Engelhard spent freely to match Forbes. Forbes owned his own local newspaper, the Messenger Gazette, so Engelhard bought out the Somerville Star to serve as his campaign bulletin. At one point during the campaign, Engelhard reportedly campaigned by sailing his yacht down the Raritan River wearing a white naval uniform.

Results

Forbes survived a challenge and recount. Engelhard reportedly felt the loss was a blessing in disguise, as it allowed him to focus his efforts on his vast industrial empire. He later became the inspiration for the James Bond villain Auric Goldfinger.

Forbes ran for Governor in 1957 and secured the Republican nomination but lost to Meyner by over 200,000 votes.

Union

Warren

References 

New Jersey State Senate elections
New Jersey State Senate